Louis Pierre d'Hozier (20 November 1685 – 25 September 1767) was a French nobleman and genealogist and the fourth holder of the post of . He was born and died in Paris.

The grandson of Pierre d'Hozier and nephew of Charles René d'Hozier, he collaborated with his youngest son Antoine Marie d'Hozier to produce the 10-volume l'Armorial de France (1738-1768), covering most of the French noble families of the time.

He published the Armorial général, ou registre de la noblesse de France (10 vols, 1738–1768), which must not be confounded with the publication written by his uncle, inasmuch as it related solely to noble families and was not an official collection.

Complete copies of this work, which should contain six , are comparatively rare. A seventh , forming vol. xi, prepared by Ambroise-Louis-Marie, nephew of Louis Pierre, was published in 1847 by comte Charles d'Hozier. Louis Pierre died on 25 September 1767.

His eldest son, Antoine Marie d'Hozier de Sérigny (1721 – c. 1810), was his father's collaborator and continuator; and his fourth son, Jean-François Louis, wrote an account of the Knights of St Michael in the province of Poitou, which was published in 1896 by the vicomte P de Chabot.

References

External links

 
 

French genealogists
French heraldists
Nobility from Paris
French information and reference writers
Officers of arms
1685 births
1767 deaths
18th-century French writers
18th-century French male writers
French male non-fiction writers